The National Economic Advisory Council was set up by second Labour government of United Kingdom Prime Minister Ramsay MacDonald.

The  Prime Minister chaired the Council which included several cabinet ministers, businessmen, the trade unionist Ernest Bevin, the economic historian R. H. Tawney and several economists G. D. H. Cole, Hugh Dalton, Maynard Keynes, A. C. Pigou, Colin Clark and Lionel Robbins.

References

1929 establishments in the United Kingdom
Ramsay MacDonald
Economic history of the United Kingdom